The Stranger is a 2012 Turkish drama film directed by Filiz Alpgezmen. It was entered into the 18th London Turkish Film Festival.

Cast
 Sezin Akbasoğulları
 Caner Cindoruk
 Serkan Keskin

Plot
The film centres around a young French-Turkish woman of Turkish origin.  She is trying to fulfill her late father's last wish - to be buried in Istanbul, despite being defined as a "revolutionary" who left Turkey undercover during the 1980 coup d'état.

References

External links
 

2012 films
2012 drama films
Turkish drama films
2010s Turkish-language films
2010s French-language films
2012 multilingual films
Turkish multilingual films